is a railway station in Yahatanishi-ku, Kitakyushu, Japan, operated by the JR Kyushu.

Lines
Orio Station is served by the Kagoshima Main Line and Chikuho Main Line.

Station layout
The two lines serving the station intersect at Orio, and the lines are connected by a spur track. The station therefore consists of two separated blocks: the main building with bi-level platforms at the crossing point, and detached platforms on the spur.

The station has a "Midori no Madoguchi" staffed ticket office.

Platforms

Main building lower level

Main building upper level

Limited express trains, including the Sonic, stop here.

Spur track (Takami entrance)

History
The Chikuho Railway merged with the Kyushu Railway on 1 October 1897. When the Kyushu Railway was nationalized on 1 July 1907, Japanese Government Railways (JGR) took over control of the station. On 12 October 1909, the station became part of the Hitoyoshi Main Line and then on 21 November 1909, part of the Kagoshima Main Line. With the privatization of Japanese National Railways (JNR), the successor of JGR, on 1 April 1987, JR Kyushu took over control of the station.

The station building was rebuilt in 1916, but use of this building was discontinued from 6 October 2012 in preparation for rebuilding work, with operations shifted to a temporary structure. The station building was scheduled to be demolished during 2012, with the new structure completed in fiscal 2016.

Passenger statistics
In fiscal 2016, the station was used by 16,228 passengers daily, and it ranked 5th among the busiest stations of JR Kyushu.

Surrounding area
 Orio Police Station
 National Route 3
 National Route 199

Educational facilities
 Kyushu Kyoritsu University
 Kyushu Women's University
 University of Occupational and Environmental Health Japan
 Kyushu Women's Junior College
 Orio Aishin Junior College
 Fukuoka Prefectural Tochiku High School
 Fukuoka Prefectural Orio High School
 Jiyugaoka High School

Buses
Airport buses leave from a bus stop located at the west exit of the main building to the Kitakyushu Airport. Also, there is a Kitakyushu municipal bus terminal for local buses connecting vicinities including Wakamatsu and Ashiya in front of the east exit of main building.

See also
 Orio (Kitakyushu)

References

External links

 Orio Station information (JR Kyushu) 

Railway stations in Japan opened in 1891
Railway stations in Fukuoka Prefecture
Buildings and structures in Kitakyushu